The Magic Numbers is the debut album from English pop rock band the Magic Numbers. It was nominated for a Mercury Music Prize in 2005. Songwriting duties were taken by Romeo Stodart as was much of the musical composition and arrangement. It incorporated the earlier single release of "Hymn for Her" as a hidden track. The album incorporates many folk elements within the main indie sound which resounds throughout. The album also reflects many elements of the writers early childhood dreams, tales of their love life and desperation of youth. For example, "Love Me Like You", the best known single of the album, illustrates the difference of feeling in their love for each other.

Production
The Magic Numbers began recording the album in late 2004 at the Metropolis Studios in Chiswick. The album was co-produced by Romeo Stodart and American producer Craig Silvey.

Reception

The album was nominated for the Mercury Prize in 2005, but lost to Antony and the Johnsons' I Am a Bird Now. The Magic Numbers came 43rd in PopMatters' 50 Best Albums of 2005.

Track listing

Personnel
The Magic Numbers
Angela Gannon – melodica, percussion, Vocals, design
Sean Gannon – drums, design
Michele Stodart – bass guitar, keyboards, percussion, vocals, design
Romeo Stodart – guitar, piano, vocals, production, banjo on "Mornings Eleven", design

Other personnel
CC-Lab – design
Angharad Davies – violin on "This Love"
Pete Fowler – band illustration on British release
Steve Gullick – photography
Serge Krebs – engineering on "Which Way to Happy" and "I See You, You See Me"
Dom Morley – assistant engineering on "Don't Give Up the Fight"
Rich Robson – editing
Craig Silvey – recording and production on all except "Idea of a Feeling"
Bunt Stafford-Clark – mastering
Richard Wilkinson – mixing on "Don't Give Up the Fight" and "This Love", additional engineering on "Mornings Eleven", "Forever Lost", "The Mule", "Long Legs", "Love Me Like You", "This Love", "Try", and "Hymn to Her"

Release history

Charts

Weekly charts

Year-end charts

Sales chart performance

References

External links

2005 debut albums
EMI Records albums
Heavenly Recordings albums
The Magic Numbers albums